Bureau d'Enquêtes sur les Événements de Mer (BEAmer, "French Marine Accident Investigation Office") is the French agency that investigates accidents and incidents of ships. Its head office is in the Grande Arche Sud (South) in the La Défense business district and the commune of Puteaux, Hauts-de-Seine, in the Paris metropolitan area.

History
France established BEAmer, a marine casualties investigation board, on 16 December 1997. In 2003 and 2004 the agency's role within the framework of the French government was finalized.

Governance

The director since May 2019 is rear admiral François-Xavier Rubin de Cervens, (Administrator for Maritime Affairs).
Merchant marine Captain and chief engineer.

In the past the head office was in the 5th arrondissement of Paris.

See also

 Bureau d'Enquêtes et d'Analyses pour la Sécurité de l'Aviation Civile (BEA)
 French Land Transport Accident Investigation Bureau (Bureau d'Enquêtes sur les Accidents de Transport Terrestre, BEA-TT)
 German Federal Bureau of Aircraft Accident Investigation
 Marine Accident Investigation Branch
 National Transportation Safety Board

References

External links
 Bureau d'Enquêtes sur les Événements de Mer
 Bureau d'Enquêtes sur les Événements de Mer 
 
  

Government agencies of France
Maritime incidents in France
Organizations established in 1997
1997 establishments in France